Mizpar (also Mispar, Mispereth) was a Jewish exile in Babylon who accompanied Zerubbabel back to Jerusalem / Judah.

 References: ; 
 Meaning: number

External links
Easton's Bible Dictionary: Mizpar

6th-century BCE Jews